Indira Gandhi Medical College and Hospital (IGMCH), formerly the Himachal Pradesh Medical College (HPMC), formerly known as Snowdown, located in Snowdown area of Lakkar Bazaar, is a state-owned medical college and hospital in Shimla in the state of Himachal Pradesh in India.

History 

The college was established in 1966 as the Himachal Pradesh Medical College (HPMC), and assumed the present name in 1984.On 29 June 2013, Himachal Pradesh Health minister Kaul Singh Thakur said that Indira Gandhi Medical College (IGMC) would be upgraded on the analogy of All India Institute of Medical Sciences (AIIMS) under the Pradhan Mantri Swasthya Sewa Yojana, (PMSSY). The minister stated that during his meeting with Union health minister Ghulam Nabi Azad , the proposal for granting the AIIMS status to IGMC was under consideration of the government of India. The minister also added that the endeavour of the state government was to develop IGMC as a prestigious institute so that it can provide qualitative and better health services to the people of the state.

Notable alumni 

 Dr. Randeep Guleria - Director, AIIMS, New Delhi
 Dr. Jagat Ram - Former director, PGIMER, Chandigarh
 Arvind Rajwanshi - Director, AIIMS Raebareli

Department of Radiotherapy & Oncology 

The Department of Radiotherapy & Oncology of this institution is an approved Regional Cancer Centre of India. It was founded in 1977 as a Tumor Clinic of the hospital and was granted the status of RCC in 2001.

References 

Education in Shimla
Monuments and memorials to Indira Gandhi
Research institutes in Himachal Pradesh
Medical colleges in Himachal Pradesh
Hospitals in Shimla
1966 establishments in Himachal Pradesh